Edmond Budina (born 21 March 1952) is an Albanian actor, director and writer.

Biography
Budina was born in Tiranë, Albania. After finishing Albanian Art Academy in 1974, he began acting in the National Theatre of Albania. During his career, he has played more than 45 roles. His first appearance on screen was in 1978 in the movie Dollia e dasmës sime. Later on, he played various roles in other Albanian movies, in many of them as a lead actor. From 1980 to 1992, he was a lector at Albanian Art Academy.

In 1992 Budina migrated to Italy. He continued his work there, initially with small documentaries and roles in theaters, while later on with movies.

References

External links

 

Albanian male stage actors
1952 births
People from Tirana
Albanian male film actors
20th-century Albanian male actors
Living people